Three Colours: White is a 1994 comedy-drama film co-written, produced, and directed by Krzysztof Kieślowski. White is the second in the Three Colours trilogy, themed on the French Revolutionary ideals, following Blue and preceding Red. The film was selected as the Polish entry for the Best Foreign Language Film at the 67th Academy Awards, but was not accepted as a nominee.

White is about equality, with the film depicting Karol Karol, a shy man who, after being left by his wife in humiliating circumstances in Paris, loses his money, his residency, and his friends. As a deeply ashamed beggar in Paris, Karol begins his effort to restore equality to his life through revenge.

Plot
The film opens with a brief shot of a suitcase being transported on a conveyor belt, then shifts to a Paris divorce court where Karol Karol (Zbigniew Zamachowski), a Polish barber, is pleading with the judge - the same legal proceedings that Julie (Juliette Binoche) briefly stumbled upon in Blue. The immigrant Karol, through an interpreter, is made to understand that his wife Dominique (Julie Delpy) does not love him as he was unable to consummate the marriage. The divorce is granted, and Dominique proceeds to give Karol a suitcase with his possessions. Karol then loses access to his bank account, his passport, and ownership of a salon he and Dominique owned jointly. Karol breaks into the salon to sleep but is discovered by Dominique. The two first initiate sex, but Dominique stops and tells Karol that she no longer loves him. She then intentionally sets the salon drapes on fire, forcing Karol to flee and become a beggar.

While performing songs using a comb in a Paris Métro station, Karol meets a fellow Pole, Mikołaj (Janusz Gajos). While Karol has lost his wife and his property, Mikołaj is married and successful; he offers Karol a job – he would have to kill someone who wants to die but does not have enough courage to do it himself – but Karol rejects it. Karol proceeds to show Mikołaj his ex-wife from the street outside Dominique's window, but he sees the shadow of her with another man. Karol rushes back and calls her from a telephone booth at the station, only for Dominique to make him listen to her having sex, causing him to break down. Through a hazardous scheme, Mikołaj helps Karol return to Poland hidden in the suitcase shown at the beginning of the film, which is later stolen by employees at the airport. After discovering how poor he is, the airport employees beat him up and leave him in the Polish countryside. Karol manages to reach Warsaw and finds his brother Jurek (Jerzy Stuhr).

Karol soon returns to work at his brother's salon and later takes on another job as a bodyguard in a seemingly innocent cash exchange office. Using his position as a deceptively foolish bodyguard, Karol spies on his bosses and discovers their scheme to purchase different pieces of land that they know are going to be targeted by big companies for development and resell for large profits. Karol beats them to it and then tells his ex-bosses that if they kill him all his estate shall go to the church, forcing them to purchase the land from him instead. Karol then tracks down Mikołaj and asks for the job he offered to him previously. Mikołaj meets Karol in a Warsaw Metro tunnel for the execution of the "suicide", which turns out that Mikołaj is the intended victim and asks Karol to kill him. Karol first shoots a blank into Mikołaj's chest and asks him if he really wants to go through with it as the next bullet is real. Mikołaj changes his mind and thanks Karol for helping him feel alive again. He proceeds to pay Karol the money anyway, saying that he earned it.

Karol, with the money he has gained from his scheme and the payment from Mikołaj, goes into business (of a vaguely defined but possibly illegal nature) with him. Karol becomes ruthlessly ambitious, earning a fortune while improving his French and brooding over his wife's abandonment. One night, after waking up from a dream about Dominique, Karol calls her but she hangs up. Karol then devises a scheme to get revenge on Dominique. He first gives Dominique the majority of his fortune in his will, then, with the help of Mikoľaj and Jurek as well as his financial influences, fakes his own death and prepares to frame Dominique for it. On the day of his "burial", Karol sees Dominique mourning from afar. He then surprises her in her hotel room, apparently reconciling with her before making love together. In the morning, Karol leaves before Dominique wakes up. She is then awakened by local police, who arrest her on the suspicion that she murdered Karol to get his money.

Sometime later, Karol visits the prison complex where Dominique is held and sees her through her cell window. She gestures to him that she wants to remarry him, and Karol begins to cry.

Cast
 Zbigniew Zamachowski as Karol Karol
 Julie Delpy as Dominique Vidal
 Janusz Gajos as Mikołaj
 Jerzy Stuhr as Jurek
 Aleksander Bardini as Le notaire (The Lawyer)
 Grzegorz Warchoł as L'élégant (The Elegant Man)
 Cezary Harasimowicz as L'inspecteur (The Inspector)
 Jerzy Nowak as Le vieux paysan (The Old Farmer)
 Jerzy Trela as Monsieur Bronek
 Teresa Budzisz-Krzyżanowska as Madame Jadwiga

Production
The final scene of Dominique standing behind bars of her prison cell was shot months after the rest of the film, and was intended to soften Dominique's image; Kieślowski has said that he was dissatisfied with the ending shot previously and wanted her to seem less of a monster.

Analysis
The film has been interpreted as an anti-comedy by Roger Ebert, in parallel with Blue being an anti-tragedy and Red being an anti-romance.

Reception
Three Colours: White was met with critical acclaim; it holds an 88% rating on Rotten Tomatoes, with an average rating of 7.5/10, based on 52 reviews. The consensus reads: "Taking a lighter tone than the other films of the Three Colors trilogy, White is a witty, bittersweet comedy with heavier themes on its mind than one might at first realize".

Year-end lists
 4th – Todd Anthony, Miami New Times
 5th – Desson Howe, The Washington Post
 Honorable mention – Jeff Simon, The Buffalo News

Soundtrack

Awards and recognition
Kieślowski won the Silver Bear for Best Director at the 44th Berlin International Film Festival in 1994.

See also
 List of submissions to the 67th Academy Awards for Best Foreign Language Film
 List of Polish submissions for the Academy Award for Best Foreign Language Film

References

External links

 
 
 
 
 Three Colors: A Hymn to European Cinema an essay by Colin MacCabe at the Criterion Collection
 White: The Nonpolitical Reunifications of Karol Karol an essay by Stuart Klawans at the Criterion Collection
 Discover Polish Cinema with Dave – White

1994 films
1994 comedy-drama films
1994 independent films
1990s French-language films
Films about divorce
Films about immigration
Films about race and ethnicity
Films directed by Krzysztof Kieślowski
Films produced by Marin Karmitz
Films scored by Zbigniew Preisner
Films set in Paris
Films set in Poland
Films shot in Paris
Films shot in Poland
Films with screenplays by Krzysztof Kieślowski
Films with screenplays by Krzysztof Piesiewicz
French comedy-drama films
French independent films
Polish comedy-drama films
Polish independent films
1990s Polish-language films
1990s Russian-language films
Swiss comedy-drama films
Swiss independent films
1994 multilingual films
French multilingual films
Polish multilingual films
Swiss multilingual films
French-language Swiss films
1990s French films